The following is an alphabetical list of articles related to the U.S. state of Maryland.

0–9 

.md.us – Internet second-level domain for the state of Maryland

A
Adjacent states and federal district:

Agriculture in Maryland
Airports in Maryland
American Civil War in Maryland
Confederate Regiments from Maryland
Union Regiments from Maryland
Amusement parks in Maryland
Annapolis, Maryland, colonial and state capital since 1694
Annotated Code of Maryland
Aquaria in Maryland
commons:Category:Aquaria in Maryland
Arboreta in Maryland
commons:Category:Arboreta in Maryland
Archaeology of Maryland
:Category:Archaeological sites in Maryland
commons:Category:Archaeological sites in Maryland
Architecture of Maryland
Art museums and galleries in Maryland
commons:Category:Art museums and galleries in Maryland
Astronomical observatories in Maryland
commons:Category:Astronomical observatories in Maryland
Attorney General of the State of Maryland

B
Baltimore, Maryland
Botanical gardens in Maryland
commons:Category:Botanical gardens in Maryland
Buildings and structures in Maryland
commons:Category:Buildings and structures in Maryland

C

Canyons and gorges of Maryland
commons:Category:Canyons and gorges of Maryland
Capital of the State of Maryland
Capitol of the State of Maryland
commons:Category:Maryland State Capitol
Caves of Maryland
commons:Category:Caves of Maryland
Census statistical areas of Maryland
Chesapeake Bay
Cities in Maryland
commons:Category:Cities in Maryland
Climate of Maryland
Climate change in Maryland 
Colleges and universities in Maryland
commons:Category:Universities and colleges in Maryland
Colony of Maryland, 1632–1694
Communications in Maryland
commons:Category:Communications in Maryland

Companies in Maryland
Constitution of the State of Maryland
Convention centers in Maryland
commons:Category:Convention centers in Maryland
Counties of the State of Maryland
commons:Category:Counties in Maryland
Culture of Maryland
commons:Category:Maryland cuisine

D
Demographics of Maryland
:Category:Demographics of Maryland

E
Economy of Maryland
:Category:Economy of Maryland
commons:Category:Economy of Maryland
Education in Maryland
:Category:Education in Maryland
commons:Category:Education in Maryland
Elections of the State of Maryland
commons:Category:Maryland elections
Environment of Maryland
commons:Category:Environment of Maryland
Ethnic groups in Baltimore, Maryland

F

Festivals in Maryland
commons:Category:Festivals in Maryland
Flag of the state of Maryland
Former state highway routes in Maryland
Forts in Maryland
Fort McHenry
:Category:Forts in Maryland
commons:Category:Forts in Maryland

G

Geography of Maryland
:Category:Geography of Maryland
commons:Category:Geography of Maryland
Geology of Maryland
commons:Category:Geology of Maryland
Ghost towns in Maryland
:Category:Ghost towns in Maryland
commons:Category:Ghost towns in Maryland
Golf clubs and courses in Maryland
Government of the state of Maryland  website
:Category:Government of Maryland
commons:Category:Government of Maryland
Governor of the State of Maryland
List of governors of Maryland
Great Seal of the State of Maryland

H
Heritage railroads in Maryland
commons:Category:Heritage railroads in Maryland
High schools of Maryland
Higher education in Maryland
Hiking trails in Maryland
commons:Category:Hiking trails in Maryland
History of Maryland
Indigenous peoples
Colony of Maryland, 1632–1694
History of slavery in Maryland
Province of Maryland, 1694–1776
French and Indian War, 1754–1763
Treaty of Paris of 1763
British Indian Reserve, 1763–1783
Royal Proclamation of 1763
American Revolutionary War, 1775–1783
United States Declaration of Independence of 1776
Treaty of Paris of 1783
State of Maryland, since 1776
War of 1812, 1812–1815
Battle of Baltimore, 1814
Maryland in the American Civil War, 1861–1865
Border state, 1861–1865
:Category:History of Maryland
commons:Category:History of Maryland
Hospitals in Maryland
Humanim Inc.

I
Images of Maryland
commons:Category:Maryland
Interstate highway routes in Maryland
Islands of Maryland

J

K

L
Lakes of Maryland
commons:Category:Lakes of Maryland
Landmarks in Maryland
commons:Category:Landmarks in Maryland
Lieutenant Governor of the State of Maryland
Lists related to the state of Maryland:
List of airports in Maryland
List of census-designated places in Maryland
List of census statistical areas in Maryland
List of cities in Maryland
List of Civil War Confederate Regiments from Maryland
List of Civil War Union Regiments from Maryland
List of colleges and universities in Maryland
List of counties in Maryland
List of former state highway routes in Maryland
List of forts in Maryland
List of freshwater fishes of Maryland
List of ghost towns in Maryland
List of governors of Maryland
List of high schools in Maryland
List of hospitals in Maryland
List of individuals executed in Maryland
List of Interstate highway routes in Maryland
List of islands of Maryland
List of law enforcement agencies in Maryland
List of minor state highways in Maryland
List of museums in Maryland
List of National Historic Landmarks in Maryland
List of National Park System areas in Maryland
List of newspapers in Maryland
List of parks in the Baltimore–Washington metropolitan area
List of people from Maryland
List of professional sports teams in Maryland
List of radio stations in Maryland
List of railroads in Maryland
List of Registered Historic Places in Maryland
List of rivers of Maryland
List of school districts in Maryland
List of sister cities in Maryland
List of state forests in Maryland
List of state highway routes in Maryland
List of state parks in Maryland
List of state prisons in Maryland
List of symbols of the State of Maryland
List of television stations in Maryland
List of television stations in Maryland by channel number
List of towns in Maryland
List of United States congressional delegations from Maryland
List of United States congressional districts in Maryland
List of United States representatives from Maryland
List of United States senators from Maryland
List of U.S. highway routes in Maryland

M
Maps of Maryland
commons:Category:Maps of Maryland
Maryland  website
:Category:Maryland
commons:Category:Maryland
Maryland 529
Maryland Academy of Technology and Health Sciences
Maryland Association of CPAs
Maryland BayStat
Maryland Blue Crab Young Reader Award
Maryland Department of General Services Police
Maryland Free Press
Maryland National Guard Outstanding Soldier/Airman of the Year Ribbon
Maryland power plant research program
Maryland Sister States Program
Maryland State Highway Administration
Maryland State House
Maryland State Police
Maryland Transportation Authority
Mass media in Maryland
MD – United States Postal Service postal code for the State of Maryland
Monuments and memorials in Maryland
commons:Category:Monuments and memorials in Maryland
Motor Vehicle Administration
Mountains of Maryland
commons:Category:Mountains of Maryland
Museums in Maryland
:Category:Museums in Maryland
commons:Category:Museums in Maryland
Music of Maryland
commons:Category:Music of Maryland
:Category:Musical groups from Maryland
:Category:Musicians from Maryland

N
National Park System areas in Maryland
Natural history of Maryland
commons:Category:Natural history of Maryland
List of newspapers in Maryland & Newspapers of Maryland

O
Outdoor sculptures in Maryland
commons:Category:Outdoor sculptures in Maryland

P
Parks in the Baltimore-Washington metropolitan area
People from Maryland
:Category:People from Maryland
commons:Category:People from Maryland
:Category:People by city in Maryland
:Category:People by county in Maryland
:Category:People from Maryland by occupation
Philadelphia-Camden-Vineland, PA-NJ-DE-MD Combined Statistical Area
Philadelphia-Camden-Wilmington, PA-NJ-DE-MD Metropolitan Statistical Area
Pimlico Race Course
Politics of Maryland
Potomac River
Preakness Stakes
Professional sports teams in Maryland
Protected areas of Maryland
commons:Category:Protected areas of Maryland
Province of Maryland, 1894-1776

Q

R
Radio stations in Maryland
Railroad museums in Maryland
commons:Category:Railroad museums in Maryland
Railroads in Maryland
Registered historic places in Maryland
commons:Category:Registered Historic Places in Maryland
Religion in Maryland
:Category:Religion in Maryland
commons:Category:Religion in Maryland
Rivers of Maryland
commons:Category:Rivers of Maryland

S
St. Mary's City, Maryland, colonial capital 1634-1694
School districts of Maryland
Scouting in Maryland
Senate of the State of Maryland
Settlements in Maryland
Cities in Maryland
Towns in Maryland
Villages in Maryland
Census Designated Places in Maryland
Other unincorporated communities in Maryland
List of ghost towns in Maryland
Sister cities in Maryland
Sports in Maryland
:Category:Sports in Maryland
commons:Category:Sports in Maryland
:Category:Sports venues in Maryland
commons:Category:Sports venues in Maryland
State highway routes in Maryland
State of Maryland  website
Constitution of the State of Maryland
Government of the State of Maryland
:Category:Government of Maryland
commons:Category:Government of Maryland
Executive branch of the government of the State of Maryland
Governor of the State of Maryland
Legislative branch of the government of the State of Maryland
General Assembly of the State of Maryland
Senate of the State of Maryland
House of Delegates of the State of Maryland
Judicial branch of the government of the State of Maryland
Supreme Court of the State of Maryland
State parks of Maryland
commons:Category:State parks of Maryland
State Police of Maryland
State prisons of Maryland
Structures in Maryland
commons:Category:Buildings and structures in Maryland
Supreme Court of the State of Maryland
Susquehanna River
Symbols of the State of Maryland
:Category:Symbols of Maryland
commons:Category:Symbols of Maryland

T
Telecommunications in Maryland
commons:Category:Communications in Maryland
Telephone area codes in Maryland
Television shows set in Maryland
Television stations in Maryland
List of Television stations in Maryland by channel number
Theatres in Maryland
commons:Category:Theatres in Maryland
Tourism in Maryland  website
commons:Category:Tourism in Maryland
Towns in Maryland
commons:Category:Cities in Maryland
Transportation in Maryland
:Category:Transportation in Maryland
commons:Category:Transport in Maryland
Treasurer of the State of Maryland
Triple Crown of Thoroughbred Racing

U
United States of America
States of the United States of America
United States census statistical areas of Maryland
United States congressional delegations from Maryland
United States congressional districts in Maryland
United States Court of Appeals for the Fourth Circuit
United States District Court for the District of Maryland
United States representatives from Maryland
United States senators from Maryland
Universities and colleges in Maryland
commons:Category:Universities and colleges in Maryland
University System of Maryland
U.S. highway routes in Maryland
US-MD – ISO 3166-2:US region code for the State of Maryland

V
Tourist attractions in Maryland

W
Washington-Arlington-Alexandria, DC-VA-MD-WV Metropolitan Statistical Area
Washington-Baltimore-Northern Virginia, DC-MD-VA-WV Combined Statistical Area
Water parks in Maryland
Waterfalls of Maryland
commons:Category:Waterfalls of Maryland
Wikimedia
Wikimedia Commons:Category:Maryland
commons:Category:Maps of Maryland
Wikinews:Category:Maryland
Wikinews:Portal:Maryland
Wikipedia Category:Maryland
Wikipedia Portal:Maryland
Wikipedia:WikiProject Maryland
:Category:WikiProject Maryland articles
:Category:WikiProject Maryland participants

X

Y

Z
Zoos in Maryland
commons:Category:Zoos in Maryland

See also

Topic overview:
Maryland
Outline of Maryland

Maryland
 
Maryland